Bacton railway station was a station in Bacton, Herefordshire, England. It was located on the Great Western Railway branch line linking Pontrilas and Hay-on-Wye. The area is known as the Golden Valley.

History

Opened by the Golden Valley Railway in 1881,  the station closed and re-opened three times in the next twenty years, and lost the Bacton Road suffix. It closed for the last time in 1941.

References 

 Bacton on navigable 1946 O. S. map

Further reading

Former Great Western Railway stations
Disused railway stations in Herefordshire
Railway stations in Great Britain opened in 1881
Railway stations in Great Britain closed in 1941
1881 establishments in England